The community of the Fourth Creek Congregation was a group of Scots-Irish Presbyterians who first arrived in the Province of North Carolina in the mid to late 1730s and established a congregation by 1750 under pastor John Thompson in  Anson County which became Rowan County in 1753 and finally Iredell County in 1788.   The site of the Fourth Creek Congregation was chosen as the location of the county seat of Iredell County in 1789 and was named Statesville in 1789.   The Fourth Creek Presbyterian Church officially became the First Presbyterian Church of Statesville in 1875.

History
The Fourth Creek was named as such because it was the fourth creek encountered when going west from Salisbury, the earlies town in the area that was founded in 1753.  In 1750, a Presbyterian minister, John Thompson, purchased seven parcels of land that he sold to settlers that became members of his Fourth Creek Congregation.  John Thompson left the congregation in 1753, after which missionaries from the synods of Philadelphia and New York served the congregation.  A nearby fort, Fort Dobbs was constructed for defense of the settlers in 1756 and remained until 1766.

In 1773, a map of showing the location of the members of the Fourth Creek Congregation was made by William Sharpe.  (The map was later published in 1847.)  The original map is located in the North Carolina States archives. The map shows a total of 224 heads of families and the location of creeks and mills.   The map was probably made to support the appeal for formation of the Concord and Bethany Presbyterian Churches formed in 1775.  The map shows heads of families by Quadrant: 
SW Quadrant, 40 Families 
SE Quadrant, 31 Families 
NW Quadrant, 80 Families 
NE Quadrant, 53 Families

In 1778, the Reverend James Hall, who grew up in the Fourth Creek Congregation, was confirmed as leader of the Fourth Creek Congregation. Meanwhile, the state legislature created Iredell County from Rowan County on Nov 3, 1788.  One year later (1789), the legislature selected the Fourth Creek settlement as the location for the Iredell County seat. The settlement became known as "States Ville" and later "Statesville".

After William Sharpe created his map of the Fourth Creek Congregation in 1773, it was decided to create two additional church congregations--Concord Presbyterian Church and Bethany Presbyterian Church.  Dr. James Hall was appointed the pastor of all three churches on April 8, 1778.

Fourth Creek Burying Ground

The Fourth Creek Burying Ground, also called Fourth Creek or Old Fourth Creek Burying Grounds was used by the Fourth Creek Congregation and is located near the original church building. There are 600 marked graves – the oldest known burial being that of Margaret Archibald who died in July 1759. In addition, there are six more graves with dates between 1762 and 1767. The cemetery contains the remains of many of the founding fathers of Statesville and Iredell County. The Fourth Creek Congregation built a rock wall around the cemetery sometime between 1790 and 1800. This rock wall still stands today. When the city of Statesville was incorporated in 1847, a large granite boulder was placed in the northeast corner. The cemetery served as the city cemetery until the 1880s when it contained an estimated 1,200 graves. In 1887, the city of Statesville created a new city cemetery, Oakwood cemetery. The First Presbyterian Church conveyed Fourth Creek Cemetery to the city of Statesville in 1933, on condition that “the city accept and maintain the same as a memorial cemetery to be designated as Fourth Creek Memorial Burying Ground and be preserved in perpetuity as a memorial to pioneers and soldiers buried there.” In 2018, The First Presbyterian Church, Statesville, funded a ground penetrating radar study of the cemetery to attempt to identify the number of burials.

Sources

Additional bibliography
  
 , ASIN B002YFVOEA
 
 
 
 
 
 

Churches in Iredell County, North Carolina
Iredell County, North Carolina
Rowan County, North Carolina